Rajinder Kumar Kale (born 16 December 1939) is an Indian former cricketer from Northern Punjab. He was a wicket-keeper batsman and played first-class cricket for nearly five years. Kale made his first-class debut in 1963-64 season and played his last match in 1964-65.

References

External links 
 

1939 births
Indian cricketers
Living people
Northern Punjab cricketers